Te Rei Hanataua  (?–1860) was a notable New Zealand tribal leader. Of Māori descent, he identified with the Ngāti Ruanui iwi.

References

1860 deaths
Ngāti Ruanui people
Year of birth missing